Virginia Valley is an upland valley on the Antarctic continent. It lies east of Wall valley in the Olympus Range, located between the north part of Mount Electra on the west, and Mount Circe and Mount Dido on the east. The valley opens north to McKelvey Valley. The valley was named by Advisory Committee on Antarctic Names (US-ACAN) (2004) after Ross A. Virginia, a soils biologist in the Environmental Studies Program of Dartmouth College (Hanover, NH) who spent 13 field seasons in the McMurdo Dry Valleys of Antarctica as part of the United States Antarctic Program (USAP), from 1989 through 2002.

References

Valleys of Victoria Land
McMurdo Dry Valleys